13.13 is the second album by American artist Lydia Lunch, released in June 1982 by record label Ruby.

Content 

Trouser Press writes that the album "[revives] the grind-and-caterwaul of Teenage Jesus as filtered through Metal Box-era PiL, all deviant guitar and rolling rhythms". UK magazine Fact wrote that "sonically it comes over like a more droning, dissolute Stateside cousin of Siouxsie & the Banshees' Juju". The musicians who played on and co-wrote the album had been members of first wave  Los Angeles punk band the Weirdos.

Reception 

13.13 has divided critics. Trouser Press wrote that "Like her previous stuff, it manages to be simultaneously fascinating and annoying." In its retrospective review, Fact magazine qualified it as a "masterpiece".

Track listing

Personnel 
13.13
Dix Denney – guitar
Lydia Lunch – vocals, piano, production
Cliff Martinez – drums, percussion
Greg Williams – bass guitar
Production and additional personnel
13.13 – production
David Arnoff – photography
Bob Blank – engineering
Steven McDonald – engineering
James Partie – photography
Jeff Price – design
Thom Wilson – engineering

Charts

References

External links 
 
Lydia Lunch official website

1982 albums
Lydia Lunch albums
Ruby Records albums
Situation Two albums